The central bank in the Comoros
 Central Bank of the Comoros with offices in Moroni (Grande-Comore), Mutsamudu (Anjouan) and Fomboni (Mohéli)

Commercial banks in the Comoros
 Development Bank of Comoros
 Federal Bank of Commerce
 Bank for Industry and Commerce
 Exim Bank (Comoros)
 New York Securities Bank
 Societe Nationale des Postes et Services Financiers
 Foreign Financial Bank
 Micro Capitals Bank

Savings banks in the Comoros
 Meck (bank)
 iSavings Bank
 Sanduk

See also
 List of banks in Africa
 List of companies based in the Comoros

References

External links
 Website of Central Bank of the Comoros

 
Banks
Comoros
Comoros